Velibor Đurić (born 5 May 1982) is a Bosnian football manager and former player who is the manager of First League of RS club Radnik Bijeljina.

Club career
Đurić played with the youth teams of Slavija Sarajevo and then with the first teams of Proleter Zrenjanin and Glasinac Sokolac before moving to Zrinjski Mostar in the summer of 2005. He won with Zrinjski the 2008–09 Bosnian Premier League and the 2007–08 Bosnian Cup. 

Đurić's contract with Zrinjski expired on 30 June 2009 and he placed his signature under a 3-year contract with Widzew Łódź. He was released from Widzew on 16 July 2011. While at the club, he won the 2009–10 I liga.

After Łódź, Đurić also played for Olimpik, Zrinjski Mostar once again (with Zrinjski he again won the 2013–14 Bosnian Premier League) and Vitez. He totalled 202 official matches in all competitions for Zrinjski, which placed him third behind Pero Stojkić and Mario Ivanković on the club's all-time appearances list.

On 17 June 2016, Đurić signed a two year contract with Radnik Bijeljina. While at Radnik, he also became the club captain. In June 2018, he extended his contract with Radnik. So far with Radnik, Đurić has won the 2016–17, 2017–18 and 2018–19 Republika Srpska Cup. On 24 August 2019, he scored a hat-trick in Radnik's 3–0 home league win against Mladost Doboj Kakanj.

Đurić scored another hat-trick for Radnik, this time in his team's 0–4 away league win against, once again, Mladost Doboj Kakanj on 23 November 2019. He ended his career at Radnik in October 2021.

International career
Đurić made one appearance for the Bosnia and Herzegovina national team in a June 2009 friendly match against Uzbekistan national team.

Managerial career
Right after ending his playing career, Đurić replaced Vlado Jagodić as Radnik Bijeljina manager on 25 October 2021. He debuted as manager in Radnik's loss in a Bosnian Cup game against Široki Brijeg on 27 October. Đurić's first win managing Radnik was against Velež Mostar in a league game on 31 October.

Managerial statistics

Honours
Zrinjski Mostar
Bosnian Premier League: 2008–09, 2013–14

Bosnian Cup: 2007–08

Widzew Łódź
I liga: 2009–10

Radnik Bijeljina 
Republika Srpska Cup: 2016–17, 2017–18, 2018–19

Individual
Awards
Bosnian Premier League Player of the Year: 2008

References

External links

1982 births
Living people
People from Vlasenica
Association football midfielders
Bosnia and Herzegovina footballers
Bosnia and Herzegovina international footballers
FK Proleter Zrenjanin players
FK Glasinac Sokolac players
HŠK Zrinjski Mostar players
Widzew Łódź players
FK Olimpik players
NK Vitez players
FK Radnik Bijeljina players
Second League of Serbia and Montenegro players
First League of the Republika Srpska players
Premier League of Bosnia and Herzegovina players
I liga players
Ekstraklasa players
Bosnia and Herzegovina football managers
FK Radnik Bijeljina managers
Premier League of Bosnia and Herzegovina managers
Bosnia and Herzegovina expatriate footballers
Expatriate footballers in Serbia and Montenegro
Bosnia and Herzegovina expatriate sportspeople in Serbia and Montenegro
Expatriate footballers in Poland
Bosnia and Herzegovina expatriate sportspeople in Poland